Microlepia is a genus of ferns in the family Dennstaedtiaceae described as a genus in 1836. Most of the species are native to Asia, with many endemic to China, although a few species occur also in Australia, Africa, the West Indies, Latin America, and various oceanic islands.

Species

References

Dennstaedtiaceae
Fern genera
Taxa named by Carl Borivoj Presl